Nünchritz is a municipality in the district of Meißen, in Saxony, Germany.

Municipality subdivisions
Nünchritz includes the following subdivisions:
Diesbar-Seußlitz
Goltzscha
Grödel
Leckwitz
Merschwitz
Naundörfchen
Neuseußlitz
Roda
Weißig
Zschaiten

References 

Meissen (district)